Nogaro Bilbao was an ice hockey team in Bilbao, Spain. They played in the Superliga Espanola de Hockey Hielo from 1974 to 1975.

History
Hockey was popular in Spain in the 1970s, and they were the first ice hockey team to come to the city of Bilbao. The team finished last (8th place) in the Superliga Espanola de Hockey Hielo in 1974–75, and ceased operations after the season.

They were replaced by the more successful CH Casco Viejo Bilbao for the 1975–76 season.

External links
1974-75 season on hockeyarchives.info

Ice hockey teams in the Basque Country
Defunct ice hockey teams in Europe
Ice hockey clubs established in 1974
Sports teams in Bilbao
1974 establishments in Spain
1975 disestablishments in Spain